Queen Mary's Shallop is a  British royal barge commissioned by William III for Queen Mary II in 1689. She was one of several state barges used during state occasions between 1689 and 1849. However, when Prince Frederick's Barge was taken out of service in 1849, she was the only state barge of the English Crown still in use. She was finally retired in the early twentieth century.

She was present at various occasions, such as the Royal Regatta at Henley in 1912, and the Peace Pageant in 1919. In 1930 she was given to the National Maritime Museum by King George V, and is in storage as of 2021.

See also 
 State Barge of Charles II
 Gloriana

References

External links 
 

Barges
Museum ships in the United Kingdom
1680s ships
Ships and vessels of the National Historic Fleet
Ships preserved in museums